Fabius Township is an inactive township in Schuyler County, in the U.S. state of Missouri.

Fabius Township was erected in 1843, and most likely named after the North Fabius River.

References

Townships in Missouri
Townships in Schuyler County, Missouri
1843 establishments in Missouri